David Elder (born February 10, 1942) is an American politician in the state of California. He served in the California State Assembly for the 57th district from 1978 to 1992.

In 1992, Elder sought reelection to the state assembly.  However, redistricting merged his district with that of fellow Democratic assemblyman Richard Floyd (California politician) into a new district centered in and around the city Carson. While they spent most of their campaign bashing each other, then Carson councilwoman Juanita Millender-McDonald wound up winning the election, therefore beating two sitting incumbent assembly members in the Democratic primary. 

In 1994, Elder sought election to the state Board of Equalization but managed only 8% of the vote, despite raising more than $20,000 on his own, in the Democratic primary.

in 1995, Elder was caught up in a controversy over alleged violation of state law. A probate referee in Orange County, appointed by Lt. Gov. Gray Davis, stepped down because state law bars anyone from taking a partisan state office who raised more than $200 for a candidate in the past two years. In an interview Elder expressed his dismay at the state law claiming that it was never intended to apply to referee applicants who raised the money for their own elections.

References

1942 births
Living people
Democratic Party members of the California State Assembly
20th-century American politicians